Khabardar is a popular news show on NDTV India hosted by Vinod Dua, until his death in December 2021. It launched on July 19th, 2003 and aired Monday to Thursday, focusing on politics and corruption.

References

Indian television series